Vitaliy Ganich (born 29 August 1993) is a Belarusian professional footballer who plays for Shakhtyor Petrikov.

References

External links

Profile at pressball.by

1993 births
Living people
Belarusian footballers
Association football forwards
FC Shakhtyor Soligorsk players
FC Slutsk players
FC Smorgon players
FC Orsha players
FC Baranovichi players
FC Shakhtyor Petrikov players